Refitting or refit of boats and marine vessels includes repairing, fixing, restoring, renewing, mending, and renovating an old vessel. Refitting has become one of the most important activities inside a shipyard. It offers a variety of services for an old vessel of any size and kind starting with the construction itself and what is added to it, such as hardware, electric & hydraulic systems, entertainment systems, etc.

Ship refits can range from relatively straightforward small changes and new livery up to and including cutting the ship in half to facilitate near-total overhauls and redesign of interior spaces.

Refitting can be divided into several main subjects:
Adding or replacing: for example replacing old deck equipment with new or refurbished ones.
Modifying: for example modifying a yacht for participating in winning a regatta.
Customizing: for example customizing a yacht for the owner's needs and desires.
Modernizing: for example modernizing an old yacht with modern styling, technologies and systems.
Restoring: for example restoring an old wooden boat for preservation.

Examples 
Examples of recent or current ship refits include:
 Pacific Encounter, a P&O Cruises Australia ship, was refitted in a Singapore dry dock in early 2021. Over 250 contractors spent 84,000 work hours just on painting  of walls and ceilings and fitting  of new carpet, following an earlier wet dock period where more extensive refurbishment was done to the interior.
 Refit of Carnival Victory in Cadiz, Spain in 2021, after which the ship is expected to be renamed Carnival Radiance in late 2021.
 The former Costa NeoRomantica is being refitted in 1H2021 for Celestyal Cruises, and will be renamed Celestyal Experience.

See also 
 Retrofitting

References

Further reading

Shipbuilding